The Alazani is a river that flows through the Caucasus. Part of its path forms the border between Georgia and Azerbaijan, before it meets the Kura at the Mingəçevir Reservoir. The river is likely the same as that referred to by classical authors Strabo and Pliny as "Alazonius" or "Alazon", and may also be the Abas River mentioned by Plutarch (Plut. Pomp. 35) and Dio Cassius (37.3) as the location of the Battle of the Abas (65 BCE).

The Alazani originates in the Greater Caucasus, south of the main ridge, in the northwestern part of the Akhmeta District. It flows initially to the south towards the town Akhmeta, then through the fruitful Alazani Valley of Kakheti towards the southeast. The Alazani is the center of the Georgian wine industry.

The Alazani dries up during the winter, but in the late spring, snow melt from the mountains swells the river enormously; this regularly causes flooding.  The river is mainly used for irrigation and for drinking water.  In the 1990s, Chinese investors built many small hydroelectric power plants, which use the Alazani's strong current.  The river is also popular with tourists for rafting trips.

A light pollution of the river with biological substances comes from untreated sewage from the cities and other communities, as well as from the agricultural areas.  In the districts of Kvareli and Lagodekhi, water quality is said to be quite bad.

Alazani serves also as the name of different Georgian wines, among them the semi-dry brands of Marani Alazani Valley and Old Tbilisi Alazani.

See also 
Alazani Floodplain Forests Natural Monument

References

Caucasus
Rivers of Azerbaijan
Rivers of Georgia (country)
International rivers of Asia
International rivers of Europe
Azerbaijan–Georgia (country) border
Border rivers